Ramavtar Singh Jakhar is a retired international volleyball player from Jhunjhunu district in Rajasthan who serves as a chairperson for the Volleyball Federation of India.

References 

University of Rajasthan alumni
Indian men's volleyball players
Volleyball players from Rajasthan
People from Jhunjhunu district
Living people
1970 births
South Asian Games silver medalists for India
South Asian Games medalists in volleyball